Chiarano is a town in the province of Treviso, Veneto, north-eastern Italy.  It was part of the Venetian Republic until 1797, when the Republic was extinguished.

References